The Cache Heights are broad snow-covered heights about  long and  wide, located just northeast of Bonnabeau Dome in the Jones Mountains of Antarctica. Much lower than Bonnabeau Dome, the heights rise considerably above the adjacent ice surface. They were mapped and named by the University of Minnesota Jones Mountains Party, 1960–61: a food cache placed here by the party during a blizzard was never recovered.

See also
Inspiration Rocks

References 

Mountains of Ellsworth Land